Frogman may refer to

In diving
Frogman is a popular term for a scuba diver, particularly in military and other combat-type operations
Frogman Corps (Denmark) from the Royal Danish Navy
Frogman is a model of wristwatch by Casio
The Frogmen was a 1951 movie about World War II United States Underwater Demolition Teams
Frogman was a tradename used by Siebe Gorman for a brand of diver's drysuit in the 1960s and perhaps earlier
Frogman was a tradename used by Spearfisherman (company) for a brand of diver's drysuit made in 1945 and perhaps earlier
Frogman was a nickname of the United States Navy Search and Rescue Swimmers who picked up Astronauts who splashed down in the Atlantic Ocean.

People
Clarence "Frogman" Henry was a musician active in the 1960s and 70s, so nicknamed for his very deep voice

Fiction
Frogman (Oz character) was a The Wonderful Wizard of Oz series character; he is a man-size talking frog
In the Marvel Comics universe:
Frog-Man is a Marvel Comics superhero associated with Spider-Man
Frog-Man (Ani-Men) is a Marvel Comics supervillain
The Frogmen was a 1960s USA published Dell comic book about the adventures of a group of divers.
Leap-Frog, also known as Frog-Man, is also a Marvel Comics supervillain
The word "frogmen" was used for frog-like monsters made out of men in the Hellboy comic by Mike Mignola. See Ogdru Jahad#The role of the "Frog monsters"
Frogman Comics, a monthly or 2-monthly comic book that ran in 12 issues from Jan 1952 to May 1953, about 37 pages per issue, published by Hillman Periodicals; online at this link
An unaired TV-movie starring O.J. Simpson

Other uses
An amphibian humanoid
A night soil collector

See also
Froggy (disambiguation)